Susanna Tamaro (born 12 December 1957) is an Italian novelist and film director. She is an author of novels, stories, magazine articles, and children's literature. Her novel Va' dove ti porta il cuore (Follow your Heart) was a bestseller, translated into 44 languages, and received the 1994 Premio Donna Citta di Roma.

Early life and education
Susanna Tamaro was born and raised in Trieste in 1958. The mother's family was Jewish; she is also a distant relative of the Italian writer Italo Svevo. Her parents separated, and she has described her father as an alcoholic and her mother as "cold and cruel". After her parents separated, she was raised by her maternal grandmother. She also described herself as a "strange child", and being treated by neurologists and taking medications. But then she read about Asperger's syndrome and received her diagnosis. 

She received a scholarship to study at the Centro Sperimentale di Cinematografia, an Italian school of cinema, where she obtained a diploma in direction in 1977 and began working with director Salvatore Samperi. She worked as a writer and editor in the television industry for several years.

Writing career
In 1978, she started writing her first short stories. Her first novel Illmitz was completed in 1981 but rejected by all the publishing houses she approached. It was eventually published in 2013.

In 1989, her novel La testa fra le nuvole (Head in Clouds) was published by Marsilio.  Her second novel Per voce sola (Solo Voice) (1991) won the International PEN prize and was translated into several languages. Federico Fellini said of her second novel, "It has given me the joy of being moved without embarrassing me, as it happened to me when I read Oliver Twist or certain pages of America, by Kafka." In 1991, she wrote  a book for children Cuore di ciccia.

Her 1993 novel Va' dove ti porta il cuore (Follow your Heart) did not receive favorable reception from critics when it was first published, but it became a bestseller and sold 15 million copies by 2008. It is described as the "Italian book most sold in the 20th century"; as of 2008, about 25,000 copies had sold in the United States. The novel won the Premio Donna Citta di Roma award in 1994. By 2002, it was translated into 44 languages. In 1996, the Italian director, Cristina Comencini, made a film of the same name based on the novel. 

In 1997, she published the novel Anima Mundi, and was widely criticized for her portrayal of Father Walter in what she described as "a shameful campaign" of "insults, threats and slander". In 1998, she published Dear Matildha - I can't wait for man to walk, a collection of articles she wrote for Famiglia Cristiana, an Italian magazine. 

Her book Rispondimi (Answer Me) was described by Kirkus Reviews as "Holy abstractions brightened by dollops of sex and violence." The book consists of three stories, featuring the daughter of a prostitute, the wife of a businessman, and a jealous husband. A review by World Literature Today states, "The book's title comes from the closing passage of the first story, when Rosa, alone in the world, asks a stray white dog (a white dog appears in each story) if Someone guides us or if we are alone in the world. When the dog just looks at her with its tongue hanging out, she tells it to speak, to answer her: "Rispondimi"." A review in Library Journal refers to the protagonists in each story and concludes, "Their bitterness at the world and inability to love or be loved is so off-putting that the reader is likely to stop caring long before they reach their moments of truth. Not recommended." A review by Publishers Weekly states, "If Tamaro's view is dark, the care she takes with character development infuses her narratives with a clear and resonant moral vision."

In 2001, she wrote Raccontami. In 2002, she wrote Più fuoco, più vento; in 2003 Fuori.

In 2005, she directed the film Nel mio amore, based on a story from Answer Me, titled "Hell does not exist". 

In 2006, she published Ascolta la mia voce (Listen to my voice), a sequel of Follow your Heart. This novel was translated in twelve languages.

In 2008, she published Luisito- A Love Story.

In September 2018 she announced the release of her next book and anticipated that in it she tells of being affected by Asperger syndrome since the early years of life.

Documentary
In 2021, a documentary about Tamaro titled Inedita was shown at the Rome Film Festival and then on television in Italy on channel Rai 5. In the documentary, she discusses her life with Asperger's syndrome, her writing career, and her various interests, including bicycle repair, beekeeping, and the practice of martial arts.

Awards and honors

Prize Italo Calvino for "La testa fra le nuvole" (1989)
Prize Elsa Morante for La testa fra le nuvole (1990)
International PEN for "Per voce sola" (1991)
Rapallo Carige Prize for women writers for "Per voce sola" (1992)
Cento Prize for Il cerchio magico (1995)
Honorary Golden Dante of A.L. "Bocconi d'Inchiostro" - Bocconi University for her outstanding career (2013)
Donna Città di Roma for "Va dove ti porta il cuore" (1994)
Strega Prize, Italy, for Salta Bart (2016)

Works
La testa tra le nuvole (1989) 
Per voce sola (1991) 
For Solo Voice 
Cuore di ciccia (1992) 
Il cerchio magico (1994)
Va' dove ti porta il cuore (1993) 2018 2nd edition - 
Follow your Heart (1994) 
Anima Mundi (1997) 
Anima Mundi (English) (2007) 
Cara Mathilda. Lettere a un'amica (1997)
Tobia e l'angelo (1998)
Verso casa (1999)
Papirofobia (2000)
Rispondimi (2001) Rizzoli 
Answer me (2007) 
Più fuoco più vento (2002)
Fuori (2003)
Ogni parola è un seme (2005)
Ascolta la mia voce (2007) 
Listen to my voice (2008) 
Luisito - Una storia d'amore (2008)
 Il grande albero (2009)
 El gran árbol tr. by Guadalupe Ramírez Muñoz, (2010) 
 Per sempre, (2011)	
 L' isola che c'è. Il nostro tempo, l'Italia, i nostri figli (2011).
 Ogni angelo è tremendo, (2013)
 Via Crucis. Meditazioni e preghiere, (2013) (E-book)
 Un'infanzia: adattamento teatrale di Adriano Evangelisti, (2013) (E-book)
 Sulle orme di San Francesco, (2014) (E-book)
 Illmitz, (2014)	
 Salta Bart!, (2014)
 Un cuore pensante, (2015)
 The tiger and the acrobat, (2017) 
 Il tuo sguardo illumina il mondo (2018)

Filmography
 Nel mio amore (2004)

Personal life
In a 2002 interview, Tamaro described herself as an environmentalist and a vegetarian, and "a Christian more than a Catholic" due to the religious beliefs of her family, including her father's interest in Taoism and her Jewish mother. As of 2021, she has lived with the writer Roberta Mazzoni for more than thirty years.

References

External links
 
 International PEN
 
titles at the Italian OPAC
titles on Google Books

1957 births
Living people
20th-century Italian novelists
21st-century Italian novelists
Italian people of Jewish descent
Writers from Trieste
People with Asperger syndrome
Centro Sperimentale di Cinematografia alumni
Italian women novelists
21st-century Italian women writers
20th-century Italian women writers
Jewish Italian writers